ACELL may refer to:

Advancing Chemistry by Enhancing Learning in the Laboratory, an Australian chemistry teaching project
 Australasian Chemistry Enhanced Laboratory Learning, of the Royal Australian Chemical Institute
ACell Incorporated, a Maryland-based biotechnology company specializing in regenerative medicine
 Federació Catalana d'Esports per a Disminuïts Psíquics (abbreviated "ACELL"; formerly Associació Catalana d'Esports i Lleure), a sports federation for the mentally challenged in Catalonia; a component federation of the Sports Federation Union of Catalonia

See also

 Accell NV, Dutch bicycle company
 
 Cell (disambiguation)
 Ace 2 (disambiguation)
 Accel (disambiguation)
 Acel (disambiguation)